Shah is a royal title that was historically used by the leading figures of Iranian monarchies. It was also used by a variety of Persianate societies, such as the Ottoman Empire, the Kazakh Khanate, the Khanate of Bukhara, the Emirate of Bukhara, the Mughal Empire, the Bengal Sultanate, historical Afghan dynasties, and among Gurkhas. Rather than regarding himself as simply a king of the concurrent dynasty (i.e. European-style monarchies), each Iranian ruler regarded himself as the Shahanshah or Padishah in the sense of a continuation of the original Persian Empire.

Etymology
The word descends from Old Persian xšāyaθiya "king", which used to be considered a borrowing from Median, as it was compared to Avestan xšaθra-, "power" and "command", corresponding to Sanskrit (Old Indic) kṣatra- (same meaning), from which kṣatriya-, "warrior", is derived. Most recently, the form xšāyaθiya has been analyzed as a genuine, inherited Persian formation with the meaning 'pertaining to reigning, ruling'. This formation with the "origin" suffix -iya is derived from a deverbal abstract noun *xšāy-aθa- 'rule, ruling, Herrschaft, from the (Old Persian) verb xšāy- 'to rule, reign'. The full, Old Persian title of the Achaemenid rulers of the First Persian Empire was Xšāyaθiya Xšāyaθiyānām or (Modern Persian) Šāhe Šāhān, "King of Kings" or "Emperor". This title has ancient Near Eastern or Mesopotamian precedents. The earliest attestation of such a title dates back to the Middle Assyrian period as šar šarrāni, in reference to the Assyrian ruler Tukulti-Ninurta I (1243–1207 BC).

History

Šāh, or Šāhanšāh (King of Kings) to use the full-length term, was the title of the Persian emperors. It includes rulers of the first Persian Empire, the Achaemenid dynasty, who unified Persia in the sixth century BC, and created a vast intercontinental empire, as well as rulers of succeeding dynasties throughout history until the twentieth century and the Imperial House of Pahlavi.

While in Western sources the Ottoman monarch is most often referred to as a Sultan, in Ottoman territory he was most often referred to as Padishah and several used the title Shah in their tughras. Their male offspring received the title of Şehzade, or prince (literally, "offspring of the Shah", from Persian shahzadeh).

The full title of the Achaemenid rulers was Xšāyaθiya Xšāyaθiyānām, literally "King of Kings" in Old Persian, corresponding to Middle Persian Šâhân Šâh, and Modern Persian  (Šâhanšâh). Both terms were often shortened to their roots shah and basileus.

In Western languages, Shah is often used as an imprecise rendering of Šāhanšāh. The term was first recorded in English in 1564 as a title for the King of Persia and with the spelling Shaw. For a long time, Europeans thought of Shah as a particular royal title rather than an imperial one, although the monarchs of Persia regarded themselves as emperors of the Persian Empire (later the Empire of Iran). The European opinion changed in the Napoleonic era, when Persia was an ally of the Western powers eager to make the Ottoman Sultan release his hold on various (mainly Christian) European parts of the Ottoman Empire, and western (Christian) emperors had obtained the Ottoman acknowledgement that their western imperial styles were to be rendered in Turkish as padishah.

In the twentieth century, the Shah of Persia, Mohammad Reza Pahlavi, officially adopted the title  Šâhanšâh and, in western languages, the rendering Emperor. He also styled his wife  Shahbânū ("Empress"). Mohammad Reza Pahlavi was the last Shah, as the Iranian monarchy was abolished after the 1979 Iranian Revolution.

Ruler styles
 From the reign of Ashot II , the Bagratid kings of Armenia used the title shahanshah, meaning "king of kings".
 The title Padishah (Great King) was adopted from the Iranians by the Ottomans and by various other monarchs claiming imperial rank, such as the Mughals that established their dynasty in the Indian subcontinent.
 Another subsidiary style of the Ottoman and Mughal rulers was Shah-i Alam Panah, meaning "the king that is the refuge of the world."
 The Shah-Armens ("Kings of Armenia", sometimes known as Ahlahshahs), used the title Shāh-i Arman (lit. "Shah of Armenians").
 Some monarchs were known by a contraction of the kingdom's name with shah, such as Khwarezmshah, ruler of the realm of Khwarezmia in the Central Asia, or the Shirvanshah of the historical region of Shirvan in Caucasia (present-day Republic of Azerbaijan)
 The kings of Georgia called themselves shahanshah alongside their other titles. The Georgian title mepetmepe (also meaning King of Kings [Mepe-king in Georgian]) was also inspired by the shahanshah title.

Shahzade
Shahzade (transliterated as Šâhzâde). In the realm of a shah (or a loftier derived ruler style), a prince or princess of the royal blood was logically called shahzada as the term is derived from shah using the Persian patronymic suffix -zâde or -zâdeh, "born from" or "descendant of". However the precise full styles can differ in the court traditions of each shah's kingdom. This title was given to the princes of the Ottoman Empire (Şehzade, Ottoman Turkish: شهزاده) and was used by the princes of Islamic India (Shahzāda, Urdu: شہزاده) such as in the Mughal Empire. The Mughals and the Sultans of Delhi were not of Indian origin but of Mongol-Turkic origin and were heavily influenced by Persian culture, a continuation of traditions and habits ever since Persian language was first introduced into the region by Persianised Turkic and Afghan dynasties centuries earlier.

Thus, in Oudh, only sons of the sovereign shah bahadur (see above) were by birth-right styled "Shahzada [personal title] Mirza [personal name] Bahadur", though this style could also be extended to individual grandsons and even further relatives. Other male descendants of the sovereign in the male line were merely styled "Mirza [personal name]" or "[personal name] Mirza". This could even apply to non-Muslim dynasties. For example, the younger sons of the ruling Sikh maharaja of Punjab were styled "Shahzada [personal name] Singh Bahadur".

The borrowing shahajada, "Shah's son", taken from the Mughal title Shahzada, was the usual princely title borne by the grandsons and male descendants of a Nepalese sovereign in the male line of the Shah dynasty until its abolition in 2008.

For the heir to a "Persian-style" shah's royal throne, more specific titles were used, containing the key element Vali Ahad, usually in addition to shahzada, where his junior siblings enjoyed this style.

Other styles
 Shahbanu (Persian , Šahbânū): Persian term using the word shah and the Persian suffix -banu ("lady"): Empress, in modern times, the official title of Empress Farah Pahlavi.
 Shahpur (Persian  Šâhpur) also been derived from shah using the archaic Persian suffix -pur "son, male descendant", to address the Prince.
 Shahdokht (Persian  Šâhdoxt) is also another term derived from shah using the Persian patronymic suffix -dokht "daughter, female descendant", to address the Princess of the imperial households.
 Shahzade (Persian  Šâhzâde): Persian termination for prince (lit; offspring of the Shah); used by Ottoman Turks in the form Şehzade.
 Malek ol-Moluk "king of kings", an Arabic title used by the Iranian Buyids, a Persianized form of the Abbasid amir al-umara

Related terms
 Satrap, the term in Western languages for a governor of a Persian province, is a distortion of xšaθrapāvan, literally "guardian of the realm", which derives from the word xšaθra, an Old Persian word meaning "realm, province" and related etymologically to shah.
 Maq'ad-è-Šâh (Persian:  Maq'ad-è-Šâh), the phrase from which the name of Mogadishu is believed to be derived, which means "seat of the Shah", a reflection of the city's early Persian influence.
 The English word "check-mate" is in fact derived from "shah" (from Persian via Arabic, Latin and French). Related terms such as "chess" and "exchequer" likewise originate from the Persian word, their modern senses having developed from the original meaning of the king piece.

See also
 Ikhshid
 Mirmiran
 Shah (surname)

References

External links

 Last name: Shah at surnamedb.com
 WorldStatesmen – here Iran; see each present country
 Etymology OnLine

Heads of state in Asia
Royal titles
Noble titles
Persian words and phrases
Titles of national or ethnic leadership
Ottoman titles
Titles in Iran
Titles in Azerbaijan
Titles in Bangladesh
Titles in Pakistan
Government of the Sasanian Empire
Government of the Parthian Empire